Mickey Guidry (born August 9, 1966) is a former American football quarterback who played two seasons with the New Orleans Night of the Arena Football League. He played college football at Louisiana State University. He was also a member of the San Antonio Riders and Sacramento Surge of the World League of American Football.

References

External links
Just Sports Stats
College stats

Living people
1966 births
Players of American football from Louisiana
American football quarterbacks
LSU Tigers football players
San Antonio Riders players
Sacramento Surge players
New Orleans Night players